Boophis williamsi is a species of frog in the family Mantellidae endemic to Madagascar.
Its natural habitats are subtropical or tropical moist montane forests, subtropical or tropical high-altitude grassland, rivers, and heavily degraded former forests.
It is threatened by habitat loss.

References

Sources

williamsi
Endemic frogs of Madagascar
Taxa named by Jean Marius René Guibé
Amphibians described in 1974
Taxonomy articles created by Polbot